Inela Nogić (born 1976) became world-famous during the Siege of Sarajevo when she won the 1993 Miss Besieged Sarajevo, which was held in a basement in an effort to avoid the barrage of sniper attacks from Serb militias. Nogić and the other contestants held up a banner that read "Don't let them kill us". The pageant was documented by an amateur filmmaker, whose footage director Bill Carter then used in his documentary Miss Sarajevo. The documentary was broadcast internationally, provoking a viewer response that added to the international pressure to end the siege. Footage of the documentary was incorporated into the single "Miss Sarajevo" by the Irish band U2 together with Brian Eno and the Italian opera singer Luciano Pavarotti. Nogić's picture was also featured on the cover of the single, taken during the pageant. Nogić was 17 years old at the time.

After the war ended, Nogić was invited to the 1997 concert given by U2 in Sarajevo, and personally escorted by the band.

As of 2012, Nogić has been living in the Netherlands and is the mother of two.

See also
Vedran Smailović, known as the "Cellist of Sarajevo"
Romeo and Juliet in Sarajevo
Miss Sarajevo

References

External links
https://www.volkskrant.nl/mensen/al-25-jaar-miss-sarajevo-betrokken-u2-vulde-zijn-zakken-over-onze-rug~b9f4e229/
Inela Nogić's Twitter account

1976 births
Living people
Bosniaks of Bosnia and Herzegovina
Bosnia and Herzegovina Muslims
People from Sarajevo
Siege of Sarajevo
Bosnia and Herzegovina emigrants to the Netherlands